SL-10 may refer to:

Polyot rocket, type 11A59, used from 1963-1964
Sony CLIÉ PEG-SL10, a PDA released by Sony in 2002
Technics SL-10, an automatic turntable produced from 1979-1985